Horse's Neck is a collection of short stories written by Pete Townshend between 1979 and 1984. It was first published in 1985 by Faber and Faber.

Reviews
Although the stories might be considered semi-autobiographical, Townshend wrote in the preface: "I have never wanted simply to tell my own story. But I have tried here to attend to a wide range of feelings . . . aspects of my struggle to discover what beauty really is."

Reviewer Susan Avallone wrote that the collection of stories was "intriguing experimental writing" and "a strange and compelling collection of poetry and prose," uncovering "family, friends, ambition, addiction, infidelity, obsession, and life on the road." A theme provided by references to horses appeared to be "part obsession and part allegory."  She especially pointed out "Champagne on the Terraces" as "a haunting insight into alcoholism and family life."

Contents
Along with the preface written by Townshend, the book contains the following stories:

 "Thirteen"
 "Horses"
 "The Pact"
 "Champagne on the Terraces"
 "Ropes"
 "Tonight's the Night"
 "Fish Shop"
 "Pancho and the Baron"
 "Winston"
 "A Death in the Day Of"
 "The Plate"
 "Laguna: Valentine's Day 1982"

References

Pete Townshend
1985 short story collections
British short story collections
Faber and Faber books